Thiruvidaimarudur (also spelt as Thiruvidaimaradur or Tiruvidaimarudur) is a panchayat town in Thanjavur district, in the Indian state of Tamil Nadu.  The town is notable for its Mahalingeshwarar Temple, a Hindu shrine for Lord Shiva.

Geography

Demographics
The 2001 Indian census recorded Thiruvidaimarudur as having a population of 13,758. Males and females each constituted 50% of the population. Thiruvidaimarudur has an average literacy rate of 74%, higher than the national average of 59.5%: male literacy is 80%, and female literacy is 68%. 11% of the town's population is under 6 years of age.

Politics
Thiruvidaimarudur assembly constituency is part of Mayiladuturai (Lok Sabha constituency). Govi. Chezhiyan is the current MLA of Thiruvidaimaruthur assembly constituency and the current MP of Mayiladuthurai Lok Sabha constituency S. Ramalingam is from Thiruvidaimaruthur.

The temple
Tiruvidaimarudur has a rich heritage of fertility and people have habit of harvesting thrice in a year. Sometimes the River Cauvery makes a fourth harvest possible..

Tiruvidaimarudur has a Siva Temple namely Mahalingha Swamy with the Goddess Brahath Sundara Gujambal(In Tamil, it is Perunala Mamulai Ammai). Shiva is worshiped as Mahalingeswaraswamy, and is represented by the lingam. This lingam, known as Jothimayalingam  is “believed to be the focal point for the seven consorts of Shiva.”  The Nandhi in the Temple is one of the largest in the district, of course it is not made of a single stone, that is why it is not weighted more than the Brahdeshwara Temple at Tanjore though it is bigger in size than that. There is a separate Sannathi for "Moogambigai" with Maha Meru. 
There are 149 inscriptions found in the temple which indicate the “contributions from Pandyas, Cholas, Thanjavur Nayaks and Thanjavur Maratha kingdom.” The present masonry structure of the temple was built during the Chola dynasty in the 9th century. Later the Thanjavur Nayaks expanded the temple during the 16th century.

Two temple festivals are being celebrated for 10 days - "Thai Poosam" In January- February and another one, Thirukkalyana Uthsavam (Vasantha utsavam) in Vaigasi (May). 63 Nayanmar Ula and Aruthra Darshan( like in Chidambaram) are the other two important temple festivals. There are 27 star lingas, the prince "Ammani Ammal" Vigragam and Chitra prakaram(enclosed precincts of a temple) which is full of painting. There are several charitable trusts, one of them being "Pachhiyappa Mudhaliyar ArakattaLai".

Notable People
Tiruvidaimarudur is the birthplace of the Hindu Saint Pattinathar - in the medieval period - whose lyrics are renowned for realizing self in the Tamil Saiva tradition of Hinduism. 

It is also the birthplace of the Carnatic music flautist T. R. Mahalingam.

See also
 Vannakkudi
 Chinnakadaistreet

External links
Thiruvidaimaruthur Maha Linga swamy temple information and photos

References

Cities and towns in Thanjavur district